Navaghana was an early Chudasama king known only from the ballads and folklore of Saurashtra  region of Gujarat, India. His capital was at Vamanasthali (now Vanthali) which he later moved to Junagadh during his last years of reign.

In bardic literature 
The bardic literature says his father Dyas was defeated by Patan Raja (probably Chaulukya king) and Navaghana was rescued. When Navaghana grew up, he regained the throne. He may have been benefited by weakened Chaulukyas due to invasion of Mahmud Ghazni who attacked desecrated the Somnath temple in 1024 CE. Navaghana came to power soon after the attack.

Successors 
According to bardic tales and folklore, Navaghana reigned from 1026 CE to 1044 CE and he was succeeded by his son Khengara who reigned for 23 years (1144-1167 CE), followed by his son Navaghana. Udayamati, wife of Chaulukya ruler Bhima I, was a daughter of his son Khengara.

== Cultural activities ==
The construction of Navghan Kuvo, a stepwell in the Uparkot Fort, is attributed to him. It is considered an oldest example of stepwell in Gujarat by some scholars.

References 

Chudasama dynasty
10th-century Indian monarchs
Legendary monarchs